Colt C. Gilliam (born December 27, 1989) is an American professional stock car racing driver. Gilliam competes in the super stock division at Carolina Speedway in Gastonia, North Carolina. He made his NASCAR Gander Outdoors Truck Series debut in the 2019 Eldora Dirt Derby driving the No. 8 Chevrolet Silverado for NEMCO Motorsports.

Motorsports career results

NASCAR
(key) (Bold – Pole position awarded by qualifying time. Italics – Pole position earned by points standings or practice time. * – Most laps led.)

Gander Outdoors Truck Series

 Season still in progress
 Ineligible for series points

References

External links
 

NASCAR drivers
Living people
Racing drivers from South Carolina
People from Rock Hill, South Carolina
1989 births